The 1963 Utah Redskins football team was an American football team that represented the University of Utah as a member of the Western Athletic Conference (WAC) during the 1963 NCAA University Division football season. In their sixth season under head coach Ray Nagel, the Redskins compiled an overall record of 4–6 with a mark of 2–2 against conference opponents, tying for third place in the WAC. Home games were played on campus at Ute Stadium in Salt Lake City.

Schedule

NFL Draft
Two players were selected in the 1964 NFL Draft.

References

External links
 Official game program: Utah vs. Idaho at Boise – September 28, 1963

Utah
Utah Utes football seasons
Utah Redskins football